Search for the Gods is a 1975 made-for-television drama film directed by Jud Taylor. It stars Kurt Russell and Stephen McHattie. It was intended to be the pilot episode of a TV series that never made it into production.

Plot
Two young adventurers, Shan Mullins and Genera Juantez are searching for parts of a mysterious golden tablet, which brings to light evidence that astronauts from another world visited Earth in ancient times and had a profound effect on the technological advancement of the human race.

Cast
Kurt Russell as Shan Mullins
Stephen McHattie as Willie Longfellow
Ralph Bellamy as Dr. Henderson
Victoria Racimo as Genera Juantez
Raymond St. Jacques as Raymond Stryker
Albert Paulsen as Tarkanian
John War Eagle as Lucio
Carmen Argenziano as Wheeler

References

External links

1975 television films
1975 films
American television films
Films about ancient astronauts
Films directed by Jud Taylor
Films scored by Billy Goldenberg
1970s English-language films